Clavidesmus funerarius is a species of beetle in the family Cerambycidae. It was described by Lane in 1958, originally under the genus Orteguaza. It is known from Bolivia.

References

Onciderini
Beetles described in 1958